Dorothy Lewis Bernstein (April 11, 1914 – February 5, 1988) was an American mathematician known for her work in applied mathematics, statistics, computer programming, and her research on the Laplace transform.  She was the first woman to be elected president of the Mathematics Association of America.

Early life
Dorothy Bernstein was born in Chicago, the daughter of Jewish Russian immigrants Jacob and Tille Lewis Bernstein.  While her parents had no formal education, they encouraged all of their children to seek education; all five earned either a PhD or MD.

Education
Bernstein attended North Division High School (Milwaukee) in Milwaukee, Wisconsin.  In 1930 she attended the University of Wisconsin, where she held a University Scholarship (1933–1934) and was elected to Phi Beta Kappa.  In 1934 she graduated with both a B.A degree, summa cum laude, and a M.A. Degree in Mathematics.  She did her master's thesis research on finding complex roots of polynomials by an extension of Newton's method.  In 1935 she attended Brown University, where she became a member of the scientific society Sigma Xi.  She received her Ph.D. in mathematics from Brown in 1939, while simultaneously holding a teaching position at Mount Holyoke College. Her dissertation was entitled "The Double Laplace Integral" and was published in the Duke Mathematical Journal.

Career
From 1943 to 1959 Bernstein taught at the University of Rochester, where she worked on existence theorems for partial differential equations.  Her work was motivated by non-linear problems that were just being tackled by high-speed digital computers.  In 1950, Princeton University Press published her book, Existence Theorems in Partial Differential Equations.

She spent 1959–1979 as a professor of mathematics at Goucher College, where she was chairman of the mathematics department for most of that time (1960–70, 1974–79).

She professed that she was particularly interested combining pure and applied mathematics in the undergraduate curriculum.  Due in great part to Bernstein's ability to get grants from the National Science Foundation, Goucher College was the first women's university to use computers in mathematics instruction, beginning in 1961.  She also developed an internship program for Goucher mathematics students to obtain meaningful employment experience.  In 1972 Bernstein cofounded the Maryland Association for Educational Uses of Computers, and was interested in incorporating computers into secondary school mathematics.

Bernstein was very active in the Mathematical Association of America, where she was on the board of governors from 1965 to 1968.  She served as the vice president in 1972–73, and later became the first female president of the MAA in 1979–80.

Women in mathematics

She noted that attitudes and opportunities for women changed drastically after World War II, which she attributed to two causes.  First, that women demonstrated they could handle the jobs formerly held by men, and second that the rise of computer technology opened up many new areas of mathematical applications resulting in new jobs.

Memberships
 Mathematical Association of America
 American Mathematical Society
 Society for Industrial and Applied Mathematics
 American Association of University Professors
 Fellow, American Association for the Advancement of Science, 1981

Bibliography
 .

References

External links
"Dorothy Lewis Bernstein", Biographies of Women Mathematicians, Agnes Scott College
 Biography on p. 77-80 of the Supplementary Material at AMS
Preface of Existence Theorems in Partial Differential Equations
 

1914 births
1988 deaths
20th-century American mathematicians
American people of Russian-Jewish descent
Brown University alumni
Institute for Advanced Study visiting scholars
Presidents of the Mathematical Association of America
University of Wisconsin–Madison College of Letters and Science alumni
American women mathematicians
Goucher College faculty and staff
Fellows of the American Association for the Advancement of Science
20th-century women mathematicians
North Division High School (Milwaukee) alumni
20th-century American women
Mount Holyoke College faculty